USS Flatley (FFG-21) was the thirteenth ship of the  of guided-missile frigates. She was the first ship of the U.S. Navy to be named for Vice Admiral James H. Flatley (1906–1958), a leading Naval Aviation tactician from World War II who flew the Grumman F4F Wildcat in the Battle of Coral Sea and subsequently commanded the VF-10 Grim Reapers taking them into combat for the first time.

Ordered from Bath Iron Works on 28 February 1977 as part of the FY77 program, Flatleys keel was laid down on 13 November 1979. She was launched on 15 May 1980, and commissioned on 20 June 1981. Decommissioned on 11 May 1996, she was sold to Turkey on 27 August 1998.

TCG Gemlik (F 492) 
The ship immediately underwent conversion into a Turkish .  She serves in the Turkish Navy as TCG Gemlik (F 492).

References

External links
MaritimeQuest USS Flatley FFG-21 pages
 

Oliver Hazard Perry-class frigates of the United States Navy
1980 ships
Ships transferred from the United States Navy to the Turkish Navy
Ships built in Bath, Maine
Cold War frigates and destroyer escorts of the United States